Flotillin-2 is a protein that in humans is encoded by the FLOT2 gene.
Flotillin 2 (flot-2) is a highly conserved protein isolated from caveolae/lipid raft domains that tether growth factor receptors linked to signal transduction pathways. Flot-2 binds to PAR-1, a known upstream mediator of major signal transduction pathways implicated in cell growth and metastasis, and may influence tumour progression.

Caveolae are small domains on the inner cell membrane involved in vesicular trafficking and signal transduction. This gene encodes a caveolae-associated, integral membrane protein, which is thought to function in neuronal signaling.

References

Further reading